The John H. Daniels Faculty of Architecture, Landscape, and Design (commonly referred to as Daniels Faculty) is an academic division at the University of Toronto which focuses on architecture, urban design and art. The Faculty was the first school in Canada to offer an architecture program (founded in 1890), and it was one of the first in Canada to offer a landscape architecture program (founded in 1965). As of July 2021, its dean is Juan Du.

In 2008, the Faculty changed its name to the current one — the "John H. Daniels Faculty of Architecture, Landscape, and Design" — to acknowledge a $14-million donation made by benefactors John and Myrna Daniels, including $5-million for scholarships. More recently, in 2018, they donated $6-million for scholarships.  Following their naming gift, and the appointment of new leadership in 2009, the Daniels Faculty was profoundly transformed: it has quadrupled in size and has made several advances in the quality of its academic programs, research, public programming, and societal impact. This involved creating an inventive undergraduate foundation in architectural studies, renewing the school’s three established graduate professional programs, creating a unique PhD in architecture, landscape, and design, and founding various research initiatives, including the Global Cities Institute. The Faculty’s disciplinary reach recently expanded by incorporating University of Toronto’s programs in art/visual studies, curatorial studies, and forestry. There has also been a marked expansion of the school’s full-time, tenured faculty, and a significant number of diverse new faculty have recently joined the school, that together have helped catalyze many of the school's recent initiatives.

The most visible aspect of the Daniels Faculty’s recent transformation is the construction of the Daniels Building at One Spadina Crescent. The complex opened in 2017, reinvigorating a major civic landmark, greatly expanding the schools facilities and elevating the Daniels Faculty's status, both locally and internationally. The One Spadina project was led by the recently outgoing Dean Richard M. Sommer, and was designed by Nader Tehrani, with his Boston-based firm NADAAA, and the landscape architects Public Work. The Project has received 27 design and planning awards to date.

History

Headed by a well-known engineer named C.H.C. Wright, the Department of Architecture was established at the University of Toronto in 1890, making it the first architecture program in Canada and one of the earliest on the continent. The Department started as an affiliation with the School of Practical Sciences, and offered a Bachelor of Applied Sciences. In 1922, the undergraduate degree was changed to the Bachelor of Architecture and a Master's of Architecture degree was initiated. After this change was made, architectural instruction at U of T rapidly achieved its own identity. By 1931, an official School of Architecture was established, and courses in Landscape Architecture and Town and Regional Planning were included in the roster. After a 44-year-long term, C.H.C. Wright handed over administration of the School to Colonel H.H. Madill in 1934.

Limited first-year enrolment was introduced to the School in 1959, after an increase in applications to the School's programs following the return of citizens involved in World War II. Dr. Thomas Howarth was appointed as Director in 1958, and he brought about many changes under his leadership. The School opened up its course offerings to include related fields: a two-year Master of Science degree in Urban and Regional Planning was established in 1963, and a Division of Landscape Architecture was established in 1965 that introduced a new Bachelor of Landscape Architecture degree.

In 1961, the School moved to its long-term home at 230 College Street, where facilities were developed to accommodate students and faculty members: a library, a construction laboratory, a workshop, photography darkrooms, exhibitions areas, lecture and seminar rooms, and well-lighted studio spaces. In 1967, the School was granted faculty status with three departments: Architecture, Landscape Architecture, and Urban and Regional Planning. John Andrews was appointed Chair of the Department of Architecture in 1967. He invited Peter Prangnell to join the faculty to propose changes to the undergraduate program. In 1968, Andrews resigned as Chair to devote more time to his practice. Prangnell was made Acting Chair and then 
Chair from 1969 to 1976. The Faculty was briefly dissolved in the 70s, with the Architecture Department becoming a School of Architecture and the Landscape Department being assigned to the Forestry Department, but it returned to its establishment as the Faculty of Architecture in 1980 under the appointment of Dean Blanche Lemco van Ginkel. Shortly afterwards, George Baird was appointed as Acting Chair following the resignation of Antonio de Souza Santos. The Faculty was under threat of closure from the Provost for the first half of the 80s, but settled as a School after faculty members, the profession, the local community, and the broad architectural academic community defended the field of study to remain at U of T. Within this new framework, Anthony Eardley was appointed Dean, and shared responsibilities of Program Chair with Steven Fong; this assignment lasted until 1997, when Larry Wayne Richards assumed the role of Dean and Chair of the Architecture Program.

Richards created a divisional plan for the Faculty, which was approved by the University's Academic Board, that implemented five new academic programs: an undergraduate Major in Architectural Studies, jointly with the Faculty of Arts and Science; a trio of Master's programs in Architecture, Landscape Architecture, and Urban Design; and a small Ph.D. program in Architecture. Following the approval of this plan, the Faculty officially changed its name to the "Faculty of Architecture, Landscape, and Design" in 1998. Ten years later, John and Myrna Daniels made a historic gift of $14 million to the Faculty of Architecture, Landscape, and Design. The gift established an endowment for financial aid to students, and also launched the implementation of the expansion and renovation of the Faculty’s building. In recognition of the gift, the Faculty’s name was changed to the "John H. Daniels Faculty of Architecture, Landscape, and Design". Richard M. Sommer became Dean of the Faculty in 2009, succeeding George Baird.

Following an additional donation by John and Myrna Daniels in 2013, the John H. Daniels Faculty of Architecture, Landscape and Design revealed its plans to shift focus from 230 College to rehabilitate the One Spadina building and incorporate a large, contemporary extension on the northern half of the site. Through a design competition, Nader Tehrani, principal of the internationally acclaimed architecture firm NADAAA, and collaborator Katie Faulkner were chosen to lead the design. Toronto consultants Public Work were chosen as the landscape designers, ERA Architects as the preservation architects, and Adamson Associates as the executive architects.

Degree programs
The degrees granted at the graduate level include: 
 Master of Architecture (MArch) (Professional)
 Master or Architecture (MArch) (Post-Professional)
 Master of Urban Design (MUD) 
 Master of Landscape Architecture (MLA) 
 Master of Visual Studies (MVS): 
 Studio Art 
 Curatorial Studies

In addition to the graduate programs, the Daniels faculty offers a collaborative program in Knowledge Media Design through the University of Toronto's Knowledge Media Design Institute to all masters’ students in the MArch, MLA, and MUD programs. Master of Visual Studies candidates are eligible for a collaborative graduate program in Sexual Diversity Studies.

On July 7, 2016, the Daniels Faculty announced a new curriculum for the undergraduate degrees, beginning in the 2016-2017 school year. This new selection of degrees include:
 Honours Bachelor of Arts with a Specialist in Architectural Studies: 
 Comprehensive 
 Design of Architecture, Landscape, and Urbanism 
 History and Theory of Architecture, Landscape, and Urbanism 
 Technology of Architecture, Landscape, and Urbanism 
 Honours Bachelor of Arts with a Specialist in Visual Studies: 
 Studio 
 Critical Practices 
 Honours Bachelor of Arts with a Major in Visual Studies

Daniels Faculty Public Lecture Series
 
Each year, the Daniels Faculty of Architecture, Landscape, and Design presents public lectures, fora, and symposia that showcase leaders in the fields of architecture, landscape, urban design, visual studies, as well as important thinkers and opinion makers in allied fields. The public lectures cover the wide range of approaches taken by professionals and academics who are asking important questions about, and tackling the significant challenges facing, cities and landscapes.

Notable lecturers

 Sou Fujimoto (2015-2016)
 Alvaro Siza (2015-2016)
 Cornelia Hahn Oberlander (2014-2015)
 Phyllis Lambert (2013-2014)
 Charles Blow (2013-2014)
 Josemaria de Churtichaga (2013-2014)
 Kathryn Gustafson (2013-2014)
 Nader Tehrani (2013-2014)
 Alan Berger (2012-2013)
 Kenneth Frampton (2012-2013)
 Hrvoje Njiric (2011-2012)
 William Morrish (2011-2012)
 Nader Tehrani (2010-2011)
 Beth Meyer (2010-2011)
 Mitchell Joachim (2009-2010)
 Dirk Sijmons (2009-2010)
 Wes Jones (2008-2009)
 Kongjian Yu (2008-2009)
 Jürgen H. Mayer (2007-2008)
 Michael Van Valkenburgh (2007-2008)
 Will Bruder (2006-2007)
 Adriaan Geuze (2006-2007)
 Diane Lewis (2005-2006)
 Christophe Girot (2005-2006)
 Merrill Elam (2004-2005)
 James Corner (2004-2005)
 Preston Scott Cohen (2003-2004)
 Daniel Libeskind (2002-2003)
 Frank Gehry (1997-1998)

Research and publications

Model Cities Theatre and Lab
Located in the new One Spadina building.

Institute for Architecture and Human Health
The new Institute for Architecture and Human Health will anchor a new Masters program in Health Design. It is intended to educate professionals on how to address health care and wellness through innovations in architecture, landscape, and urban design. The Institute for Architecture and Human Health will be established once One Spadina opens to the public in the fall of 2016.

Global Cities Institute
Originally established with funding from the World Bank, the CGIF is developing standardized metrics for the global comparison of cities. 
The GCIF’s database comprises 115 indicators across a standardized set of definitions and methodologies, which enable cities to track their effectiveness on everything from planning and economic growth to transportation, safety and education. The Global Cities Institute is currently located at 170 Bloor Street West, but will be incorporated into the One Spadina building.

One Spadina Green Roof Innovation Testing Lab
Established in 2010, the Green Roof Innovation Testing Laboratory (GRIT Lab) is a facility for testing the environmental performance of green roofs, green walls, and solar photovoltaic technologies in the Canadian context. The GRIT Lab consists of 33 green roof test beds, three green walls, a weather station, and 270 sensors connected to over 5,000 linear feet of wiring. Data on soil moisture, runoff, temperature, rainfall, humidity, solar energy, and wind is collected every five minutes. The lab sits currently sits atop of the Daniels Faculty building at 230 College Street, but will later continue its work from a more prominent space atop the landscape pavilions of the new One Spadina building.

The Annual
The Annual, a publication funded and managed by the Graduate Architecture Landscape and Design Student Union (GALDSU), is a curated compilation of student work. Each academic year, graduate students are invited to apply for the editorial roles of The ANNUAL and are chosen by a GALDSU-appointed selection committee. Following the appointment of editors, an open call is issued to students from all graduate programs at the John H. Daniels Faculty of Architecture, Landscape, and Design to submit their work for consideration. Recent editors include Amanda Chong and Christine Kim (2012-2013), Jasmeen Bains and Clarence Lacy (2013-2014), Megan Esopenko and Emilia Hurd (2014-2015), Jasper Flores and Elise Hunchuck and Dayne Roy-Caldwell (2015-2016), Matthew De Santis and Liusadh Macdonald and Naomi Shevchuk (2016-2017).

The publication was funded solely by GALDSU until the 2016-2017 issue, when in a break with longstanding tradition, the publication was sponsored by third parties including local architects and professional governing bodies.

PLACE-HOLDER
PLACE-HOLDER is an independent graduate student-run journal. It is an active catalogue of design, for contemporary use and future reference, and a repository of ideas. Founded by Elizabeth Krasner and Roya Mottahedeh in 2012, it ran until at least 2016 when it received a grant under editors Michael Abel and Mina Hanna. The advisory board includes Hans Ibelings, Anita Matusevics, Shawn Micallef, Elizabeth Krasner, and Roya Mottahedeh.

Shift Magazine
Shift Magazine is the online blog and the annual undergraduate publication for the Daniels Faculty of Architecture, Landscape, and Design that showcases student work and the lifestyle of the Architecture and Visual Studies undergraduates.  SHIFT10: "Backyard Trips" was published on September 12, 2022.

Clubs and activities

GALDSU
The Graduate Architecture Landscape and Design Student Union (GALDSU) represents students in all graduate programs at the John H. Daniels Faculty of Architecture, Landscape, and Design. GALDSU serves as the liaison with the faculty, administration, other student groups, and professional organizations such as the OALA and OAA.

GALDSU is run by a democratically elected Executive Council composed of the president, vice-president, treasurer, social events chair, health & sustainability officer, and secretary. The Executive Council is responsible for the day-to-day operations of the union. A six-member executive council is elected each year. Two students represent each class by attending monthly GALDSU meetings with the executive council.

AVSSU
Established in 2014, the Architecture and Visual Studies Student Union (AVSSU) represents and acts as the official voice of undergraduate students at the Daniels Faculty of Architecture, Landscape, and Design.

Café 059
Café 059 is a student café, currently located at 1 Spadina Crescent, that is under the operation of students from the Daniels Faculty.

Distinguished alumni and faculty

Alumni
 Raymond Moriyama
 Shirley Blumberg
 Jimenez Lai
 Claude Cormier
 Bruce Kuwabara
 David Pontarini
 Craig Leonard
 George Baird
Henry Sears
 Ralph Giannone

Current faculty
 Charles Stankievech
 Ed Pien
 An Te Liu
 Lisa Steele
 Brigitte Shim

Professors Emeriti
 George Baird BArch (Toronto), AM (Hon)(Harvard) 
 Carmen Corneil BArch (Toronto) 
 Anthony Eardley AA Dipl (Hons), MA (Cantab) 
 Ants Elken Dipl Ing Arch (Munich) 
 George Hawken BA (Honours) 1969 (Toronto) 
 Douglas H. Lee BArch (McGill), MSc (Illinois), MBA (York) 
 Blanche Lemco van Ginkel, C.M., BArch (McGill), M.C.P. (Harvard), Hon Doc (Aix -Marseille) 
 Peter Prangnell AA Dipl, MArch (Harvard) 
 Larry Wayne Richards BArch (Miami, Oxford, OH), MArch (Yale) 
 Paul Sandori Dipl Ing Arch (Zagreb)

Associate Professors Emeriti
 Klaus Dunker Dipl Ing Arch (Hannover) 
 Gerald Englar 
 Edward Fife BLA (RISD), MLA (Harvard)

References

External links 

 Archival papers of Larry Wayne Richards, former Dean and Chair of the Architecture Program, are held at the University of Toronto Archives and Records Management Services.

University of Toronto
Architecture schools in Canada
Landscape architecture schools